EA-2192 is an extremely toxic degradation product of the VX nerve agent. It is a white solid that is very soluble and stable in water.

EA-2192 is an extremely potent acetylcholinesterase inhibitor. It is almost as toxic as VX itself.

See also
Nerve agent
VX (nerve agent)

References

V-series nerve agents
Phosphonothioates
Phosphonic acids
Acetylcholinesterase inhibitors
Diisopropylamino compounds